Sibusiso Victor Magaqa (born 2 November 1998) is a South African soccer player who plays as a midfielder for South African Premier Division side AmaZulu.

Early and personal life
He was born in Tongaat.

Club career
Magaqa started his career in the academy of AmaZulu, joining them at under-13 level, and made his debut for them as a substitute against Highlands Park in the final match of the 2015–16 season after a full season at Sgcino Cosmos.

He joined Uthongathi on loan in January 2018, with the loan extended in the summer of 2018.

References

External links

Living people
1998 births
South African soccer players
People from eThekwini Metropolitan Municipality
Soccer players from KwaZulu-Natal
Association football midfielders
AmaZulu F.C. players
Uthongathi F.C. players
National First Division players
South African Premier Division players